Sam's Town Shreveport is a hotel and casino in Shreveport, Louisiana. It is owned and operated by Boyd Gaming.

History

First known as Harrah's Shreveport, the hotel was purchased in 2004 by Boyd Gaming from Harrah's Entertainment. Harrah's sold this casino after acquiring Horseshoe Gaming Holding Corporation.

The casino opened under Boyd's Sam's Town brand on May 20, 2004, becoming the fifth casino to operate under that name.

The  casino features 1100 gaming machines and 29 table games for Blackjack, Roulette, Three Card Poker, and Mississippi Stud Poker. The 23-story hotel has 514 rooms.

See also
 List of casinos in Louisiana

References

External links
 

Boyd Gaming
Buildings and structures in Shreveport, Louisiana
Casino hotels
Casinos completed in 1994
Casinos in Louisiana
Hotel buildings completed in 1994
Skyscraper hotels in Louisiana
Tourist attractions in Shreveport, Louisiana
1994 establishments in Louisiana
Riverboat casinos